Waman Marka (Quechua waman falcon, marka village, Hispanicized spelling Huaman Marca) is a mountain in the Andes of Peru which reaches an altitude of approximately . It is located in the Junín Region, Yauli Province, Marcapomacocha District. It lies south of Mishipa Ñawin, northeast of a lake named Markapumaqucha.

References

Mountains of Peru
Mountains of Junín Region